Nkongsamba is a city in western Cameroon. It is in the Kupe-Manenguba department, which is in the Littoral region. As of the 2005 Census, the city had a population of 104,050.  It is a centre for the farming of palm oil, bananas and coffee, and is between two mountains, the Manengouba Massif and Mount Nlonako. The central point is the "Ville"; other areas are measured in "Kilo", for kilometer. Mbo (Manenguba) is one of the languages used locally: in the surrounding district, Kaa and Baneka are used.

Other places 

There is a weekly Thursday market at which farmers from the surrounding area gather to sell their goods.

Transport 
Nkongsamba was the terminus of the  western railway line from the port of Douala.  Completed by German colonists in 1911, the railway line played a critical economic role in facilitating the shipment of agricultural commodities, especially coffee, to Douala.  Nkongsamba slid into economic decline with the closure of the last  segment of the line from Mbanga.  The town's charming art deco railway station remains but has been converted to housing. The city also has an abandoned airstrip.

Notable natives 
 Daniel Kamwa, actor and filmmaker
 Francine Gálvez, television presenter
 Diederrick Joel, football player
 Samuel Eto'o, football player

Gallery

See also
 Communes of Cameroon
 Fultang Bilingual High School
 Ambazonia
 Transport in Cameroon

References 

Populated places in Littoral Region (Cameroon)